The 1958 Norwegian Football Cup was the 53rd season of the Norwegian annual knockout football tournament. The tournament was open for all members of NFF, except those from Northern Norway. Fredrikstad was the defending champions, but was beaten 1–0 by Lillestrøm in the semifinal.

The final was played at Ullevaal Stadion in Oslo on 19 October 1958, and was contested by the four-times former winners Skeid, and Lillestrøm who had lost both their previous appearances in the Norwegian Cup final in 1953 and 1955. Skeid won 1–0 against Lillestrøm in the final, and secured their fifth title.

First round

|-
|colspan="3" style="background-color:#97DEFF"|Replay

|}

Third round

|colspan="3" style="background-color:#97DEFF"|10 August 1958

|-
|colspan="3" style="background-color:#97DEFF"|Replay: 14 August 1958

|}

Fourth round

|colspan="3" style="background-color:#97DEFF"|31 August 1958

|}

Quarter-finals

|colspan="3" style="background-color:#97DEFF"|21 September 1958

|-
|colspan="3" style="background-color:#97DEFF"|Replay: 24 September 1958

|}

Semi-finals

|colspan="3" style="background-color:#97DEFF"|5 October 1958

|}

Final

See also
1957–58 Norwegian Main League
1958 in Norwegian football

References

Norwegian Football Cup seasons
Norway
Cup